Calf Island Military Reservation was a World War II coastal defense site located on Calf Island in Hull, Massachusetts.

History
In 1920 there was a proposal to build a naval-type turret with two 16-inch guns on Great Brewster Island, but this was not implemented. Calf Island was also considered, but the battery was finally built (without a turret) as Fort Duvall.

The Calf Island Military Reservation was built in 1941 on state land. It consisted of an early SCR-268 radar, searchlight station, and an observation post. It was returned to the state in 1946.

The site today
The site today consists of the foundation of the observation tower.

See also
 Seacoast defense in the United States
 United States Army Coast Artillery Corps
 List of military installations in Massachusetts

References

External links
 List of all US coastal forts and batteries at the Coast Defense Study Group, Inc. website

Hull, Massachusetts
Boston Harbor islands
Military in Boston
Buildings and structures in Boston
Installations of the U.S. Army in Massachusetts